Ruisbroek may refer to:

Belgian villages:
 Ruisbroek, Antwerp, a village in the municipality of Puurs, Antwerp Province
 Ruisbroek, Flemish Brabant, a village in the municipality of Sint-Pieters-Leeuw, Flemish Brabant Province

See also 
 Jan van Ruysbroek (disambiguation)